Route 112 is a busy east/west highway on the south shore of the Saint Lawrence River in Quebec, Canada. Its eastern terminus is in Frampton at the junction of Route 275, and the western terminus is in Downtown Montreal (at the corner of Peel Street and Sherbrooke Street), after crossing the Victoria Bridge. The stretch between Vallée-Jonction and Sherbrooke is a very busy highway as it is the main link between the southern regions of Quebec, in particular the Beauce region and the Eastern Townships. Between Sherbrooke and Marieville there is less traffic, since Autoroute 10 is in close proximity to the highway. (Before Autoroute 10 was put in service in the early 1960s, Route 1 (now Route 112) was the main link between Montreal and the Eastern Townships; see paragraph below.) From Marieville to Montreal it is a very busy highway, in most parts a four-lane separated highway, upgraded to freeway standards in certain places.

Route 112 is Granby's main street (rue Principale), Magog's main street (rue Principale), and Sherbrooke's main street (rue King). It has been the road connecting most of the Eastern Townships to Montreal for decades as Route 1.

Municipalities along Route 112

 Montreal
 Saint-Lambert
 Longueuil (LeMoyne / Saint-Hubert)
 Carignan
 Chambly
 Richelieu
 Marieville
 Rougemont
 Saint-Césaire
 Saint-Paul-d'Abbotsford
 Granby
 Shefford
 Waterloo
 Stukely-Sud
 Saint-Étienne-de-Bolton
 Eastman
 Austin
 Magog
 Sherbrooke (Rock Forest–Saint-Élie–Deauville)
 Ascot Corner
 Westbury
 East Angus
 Dudswell (Bishopton)
 Weedon
 Beaulac-Garthby
 Disraeli
 Saint-Joseph-de-Coleraine
 Thetford Mines (Black Lake / Robertsonville)
 Saint-Pierre-de-Broughton
 Sacré-Coeur-de-Jésus
 East Broughton
 Tring-Jonction
 Saint-Frédéric
 Vallée-Jonction
 Saints-Anges
 Frampton

Major intersections

See also
List of Quebec provincial highways

References

External links 
 Interactive Provincial Route Map (Transports Québec) 
 Route 112 on Google Maps (Part)

112
Roads in Longueuil
Roads in Montreal
Transport in Granby, Quebec
Transport in Magog, Quebec
Transport in Saint-Lambert, Quebec
Transport in Sherbrooke